Stigmella betulifoliae is a moth of the family Nepticulidae. It was described by Puplesis and Diškus in 2003. Specimens were in Tajikistan.

The larvae feed on Betula turkestanica. They probably mine the leaves of their host plant.

References

Nepticulidae
Moths of Asia
Moths described in 2003